Aquino & Abunda Tonight is a Philippine primetime entertainment news program broadcast by ABS-CBN, hosted by Kris Aquino and Boy Abunda. It aired weeknights from 10:00pm to 10:15pm (Philippine Standard Time) on the network's Primetime Bida evening block. The show also serves as a reunion for the host tandem three years after they did SNN: Showbiz News Ngayon.

Timeslot change 

In July 2015, the show moved to a later time slot at 10:45pm Philippine Standard Time to exchange time slots with Pinoy Big Brother: 737.

Format
A run-down of daily top stories, with topics raging from entertainment, lifestyle and politics. The program promises to deliver its segments "from layman's point of view", and with perspectives on how certain issues can affect viewers' daily lives.

Hosts

Final hosts
 Kris Aquino
 Boy Abunda

Guest hosts
 Toni Gonzaga
 Alex Gonzaga
 Judy Ann Santos

Cancellation

2015: New show of Boy Abunda as a host 

In September 2015, Aquino announced her departure from the show, citing her health reasons and her taping commitments for Kris TV and her two films, which paved way for the cancellation of Aquino & Abunda Tonight on September 25 after one year, and the transition to the newest talk show with Abunda as the host, entitled Tonight with Boy Abunda for which Abunda cited it will serve as a transitional show.

See also
 List of programs broadcast by ABS-CBN

References

ABS-CBN original programming
Entertainment news shows in the Philippines
2014 Philippine television series debuts
2015 Philippine television series endings
Filipino-language television shows